Volkan Aydın (born January 11, 1969 in Kelkit) is a retired Turkish basketball player who played from 1987 to 2001.

See also
Basketball in Turkey
Rosters of the top basketball teams in European club competitions

References

External links
TBLStat.net Profile

Turkish men's basketball players
Anadolu Efes S.K. players
1969 births
Living people
People from Kelkit